The Usinskoye Oil Field is an oil field located in Komi Republic of Russia. It was discovered in 1977 and developed by Lukoil. The oil field is operated and owned by Lukoil.

References 

Oil fields of Russia